Enrico Morin (1841–1910) was an Italian admiral and politician who held several cabinet posts.

Early life and education
Morin was born in Genoa on 5 May 1841. His father was an officer of the commissariat of the royal navy of the Kingdom of Sardinia.

Between 1852 and 1857 he attended the royal navy school in Genoa.

Military and political career
Morin joined the campaign of 1860–1861 as a lieutenant. He was named the commander of the Garibaldi corvette in a world tour in the period 1879–1882. He taught tactics and ballistics at the Genoa navy school and then taught naval art at the Turin war school. He was promoted to rear admiral in 1888 and served as the undersecretary of the navy and commander of the naval academy. Then he was promoted to vice admiral and was appointed minister of navy in two cabinets led by Prime Minister Francesco Crispi. Morin's first term was between 1893 and 1894, and his second term was from 1894 to 1896. He held the same post in the cabinet of Giuseppe Saracco (1900–1901) and also in the cabinet of Giuseppe Zanardelli (1901–1903). Morin also served as the ad interim minister of war from April 1902 and as the foreign minister in 1903 for a short time. From 1 February 1904 to 9 April 1905 he was commander in chief of the naval squadron of the Mediterranean, and then headed the maritime department and the maritime square of La Spezia.

Later years and death
Morin retired from the navy in 1906. He died in Forte dei Marmi on 13 September 1910.

Awards
Morin was awarded the Royal Victorian Order on 30 April 1903 while he was serving as foreign minister.

References

External links

1841 births
1910 deaths
Italian Ministers of Defence
Politicians from Genoa
Vice admirals
Foreign ministers of Italy
Honorary Knights Grand Cross of the Royal Victorian Order